Frederick Robert Flatman (1843 – 21 September 1911) was a New Zealand Member of Parliament of the Liberal Party for the Pareora and Geraldine electorates.

Early life
Flatman was born in Suffolk and went to school in Oulton Broad. He came to Lyttelton on the Mary Ann in 1862 and went to South Canterbury. He was a successful businessman, and was storekeeper in Geraldine and Woodbury, and a sawmiller, before he concentrated on farming.

Member of Parliament
 
 
 
 
 
 
 
Flatman represented the Pareora and Geraldine electorates for fifteen years (1893–1908) in the New Zealand House of Representatives. He defeated Arthur Rhodes for the Pareora electorate in 1893 by 1594 to 1377 votes. From 1904 to 1906 Flatman served as the Liberal Party's senior whip. In 1908 he was defeated by William Nosworthy for the Ashburton electorate in the second ballot.

The Lyttelton Times described Frederick Flatman as a member "not of the ornamental type, but plain, blunt, possessing strong convictions, straightforward manners and simple directness of speech. He also acquired in 3 years a surprising grasp and mastery of political questions. He was certainly the best of the South Island farmer members-perhaps the best in New Zealand. He was a fine man."

Death
He died on 21 September 1911 at Woodbury near Geraldine.

Notes

References

|-

1843 births
1911 deaths
New Zealand Liberal Party MPs
Members of the New Zealand House of Representatives
New Zealand businesspeople
New Zealand sawmillers
New Zealand MPs for South Island electorates
Unsuccessful candidates in the 1908 New Zealand general election
19th-century New Zealand politicians
British emigrants to New Zealand